The Scharfenberg coupler (abbreviated Schaku) is a commonly used type of fully automatic railway coupling.

Designed in 1903 by Karl Scharfenberg in Königsberg, Germany (today Kaliningrad, Russia), the coupler has gradually spread from transit trains to regular passenger service trains, although outside Europe its use is generally restricted to mass transit systems. The Schaku is superior in many ways to the AAR (Janney/knuckle) coupler because it also automates electrical and pneumatic connections and disconnections. However, there is no standard for the placement of these electro-pneumatic connections. Some rail operators have placed them on the sides while others have placed them either below or above the mechanical portion of the coupler. .

Working principles
The face of the Scharfenberg coupler has a protruding cone and a matching cup. Inside the cone there is a rigid metal hoop connected to a revolving, spring-loaded metal disk with a notch on the opposite side. When ready to couple, the spring turns the disk so the hoop is extended from the cone. As the cars meet, the hoop enters the cup on the other coupler, stopping against the disk. The hoops are then pressed back into their own coupler, causing the disks to rotate until the notches align with the hoops. After the hoops have entered, the notches on the disks spring back into the hoop extended position, locking the coupling. In the coupled position, forces on the hoops and disk will balance out, which means that the Scharfenberg, unlike many other couplers, is not dependent on heavy latches to stay locked.

Small air cylinders, acting on the rotating heads of the coupler, ensure the engagement of the components, making it unnecessary to use force to get a good coupling. One problem with the coupler is that it is often hard to connect it in a curve. Planned coupling is normally done on a straight flat track, while there has been trouble coupling a broken down train at an unplanned place.

Uses

Rail equipment manufacturers such as Alstom offer the Schaku as an option on their mass transit passenger cars and locomotives. Presently, Scharfenberg couplers are in use on the following passenger transit systems:

Australia 
 Victoria - V/Line (VLocity 160), Metro Trains Melbourne (Comeng, X'Trapolis 100 [also used in Chile])
 New South Wales - Sydney Trains (T, M, A & B sets)
 New South Wales - NSW TrainLink (Endeavour railcar and Xplorer)
 Western Australia - Transperth Train Operations (A-series, B-series train)
 South Australia - Adelaide Metro (3000 class railcar)
 Queensland - Queensland Rail (EMU, ICE, SMU, IMU, NGR)

United States 
 San Francisco Bay Area - BART (New Type D and E vehicles)
 San Francisco Bay Area - Muni Metro (New Type 4 vehicles)
 Denver - RTD Bus & Rail (New light rail vehicles)
 Baltimore - Baltimore Light Rail (New light rail vehicles)
 New Jersey - New Jersey Transit (New light rail vehicles)
 Portland, Oregon - TMTC (Light rail vehicles)
 Minneapolis - METRO (Light rail vehicles)
 Norfolk, Virginia - HRT (Light rail vehicles)
 San Diego County, California (NCTD Sprinter light rail)

Canada 
 Montreal - Metro
 Vancouver - Skytrain
 Toronto - Scarborough RT

Europe 
 Thalys
 TGV – All French high-speed trains are equipped with Scharfenberg type 10 couplers.
 ICE – All German high-speed trains are equipped with Scharfenberg type 10 couplers.
 Many regional train EMUs and DMUs in Europe
 Rhine-Ruhr Stadtbahn - Almost all German light-rail and streetcar systems use Scharfenberg couplers.
 SBB Cargo – In 2019, the swiss freight operator introducing cargo wagons with Voith CargoFlex, an extension of Scharfenberg type 10 couplers.
 Channel Tunnel - Eurotunnel Le Shuttle
 Narrow-gauge railways in Saxony, Germany

United Kingdom 

 Class 175 Alstom "Coradia"
 Class 180 Alstom "Adelante", used on Grand Central and some East Midlands Railway services
 Class 185 Siemens "Desiro", operated by TransPennine Express.
 Class 332
Class 333
 Some UK Hitachi A-train AT300  including the Class 395 Javelin AT300, Class 801 Azuma AT300, and Class 802 IET/Nova 1/Paragon AT300, Class 803 AT300, and the under construction/in testing Class 805 AT300, Class 807 AT300, Class 810 Aurora AT300.
 London Underground 2009 Stock

Brazil 
 São Paulo - Companhia Paulista de Trens Metropolitanos (All vehicles, except 1700 and 5400 series)
 São Paulo - Companhia do Metropolitano de São Paulo (Type F, M and P vehicles)

Indonesia 
 Soekarno–Hatta Airport Skytrain

Philippines 
 Metro Manila MRT Line 3 Class 3000 and Class 3100

Singapore 
 Mass Rapid Transit

Taiwan 
 Taipei - Taipei Metro (Matra VAL 256, Bombardier Innovia APM 256 and Hitachi Rail Italy EMU101)
 Taoyuan - Taoyuan Airport MRT (Commuter and Express)
 Taichung - Taichung Metro (Kawasaki/TRSC EMU)
 Kaohsiung - Kaohsiung Metro (Siemens Modular Metro)

Thailand 
 Bangkok - BTS Skytrain, MRT, Airport Rail Link and SRT Red Lines

New Zealand 
 Auckland Transport suburban rail network system
 Metlink Wellington FP/FT class Matangi EMU Units  New Zealand FP class electric multiple unit

Types

Voith is known to offer the following types of Scharfenberg couplers:
 Type 10: Used for mainline railways and high speed rail applications
 Type 35: Designed for rolling stock without a compressed air system and used for urban transit applications
 Type 330: Used for trams and light rail transit
 Type 430/530: A folding coupler designed for low-floor trams and monorails
 Type 55: Designed for shunting purposes
 Type 140: Designed for industrial railways
 CargoFlex: For freight trains, based on the type 10 Scharfenberg coupler head
 CargoFlex Hybrid: For locomotives, based on the type 10 Scharfenberg coupler head, can be used with both automatic and screw couplers

See also
 Janney coupler
 Draft gear
 Railway coupling by country

References

External links 
 
 Scharfenberg coupler animation

Couplers